The Tau Herculids (TAH #0061) are a meteor shower that when discovered in 1930 appeared to originate from the star Tau Herculis. The parent comet of the Tau Herculids is periodic comet Schwassmann-Wachmann 3 with a 5.4 year orbital period. This meteor shower occurs from May 19 - June 19. The meteor shower was first observed by the Kwasan Observatory in Kyoto, Japan in May 1930. The Tau Herculids' average radiant was α=236°, δ=+41°. Due to orbital perturbations of the meteor streams by Jupiter, 2022 activity will have a radiant of R.A. = 13:56 (209), Decl. = +28 (North-West of the star Arcturus in the constellation Boötes).

On 30–31 May 2022 (31 May 4:00-5:00 UT) there was a modest meteor shower generated by fragments from the 1995 break-up of the parent comet 73P. This required that fragments had been migrating ahead of the comet for the last 27 years. The parent comet has 69 known fragments and does not come to perihelion (0.97 AU from the Sun) until 25 August 2022. The next notable appearances of the Tau Herculids are expected in 2033 and 2049.

References 
 

 http://aquarid.physics.uwo.ca/~pbrown/taus.pdf

External links 
 tau Herculids as seen by the Global Meteor Network cameras (30 May 2022 Denis Vida)
 Radio Meteor Observations (peaking around 4:00 UT 31 May)
 Tau Herculids Meteors over Kitt Peak Telescopes (Astronomy Picture of the Day accumulated over 2.5 hours very late on May 30)

Meteor showers
Boötes
Hercules (constellation)
May observances
June observances